Ibrahima Thiam (born 20 August 1981 in Guédiawaye) is a Senegalese retired footballer. He considers himself to be a target man.

Career

Bulgaria

Working out on an agreement with PFC Dobrudzha during preseason 2002/03, Thiam finished the season with one goal as Dobrudzha dispatched Botev Plovdiv 3–0. Despite interest from Beroe, he disappeared from Bulgaria without knowledge from the Dobrudzha officials.

Norway

Garnering interest from Strømsgodset Toppfotball and invited to their training camp, the Senegal youth international was rewarded a deal with Godset at the conclusion of summer 2004, breaking his duck as they felled Tromsdalen 4-2 before being let go that November.

Ireland

Rewarded a deal at Drogheda United after impressing on trial during 2008, the 6 ft 6in tall footballer first started as they took on Cork City at the Stanza Cup.  Labelled as a "beanpole", he finished the season with 15 appearances and totaled 2 goals, opening his account in a 4–0 rout of Cobh Ramblers, with his second coming as the Drogs got one point at home to Shamrock Rovers.

One fan was handed a lifetime ban when he made racist comments about Thiam.

France and Belgium 
He left Drogheda for Europe, playing with Paris SG and RC Lens, then Roeselare in Belgium.

Personal life

He is married to a Flemish woman.

References

External links 
 Ibrahima Tak Mungkin Turun Lawan Arema 
 at Soccerway 
 Stromgodset Profile

1981 births
Association football forwards
Living people
Expatriate footballers in Indonesia
Expatriate footballers in Wales
Swansea City A.F.C. players
Persebaya Surabaya players
MVV Maastricht players
K.S.V. Roeselare players
Drogheda United F.C. players
Strømsgodset Toppfotball players
Sydney FC players
PFC Dobrudzha Dobrich players
Budapest Honvéd FC players
KFC Turnhout players
Senegalese footballers
Senegalese expatriate footballers
Belgian footballers
Union Royale Namur Fosses-La-Ville players
Belgian people of Senegalese descent
C.S. Visé players
Kickers Emden players
Expatriate footballers in Germany
Expatriate footballers in Norway
Expatriate footballers in Hungary
FK Teplice players
FC Baník Ostrava players
Expatriate footballers in Belgium
Expatriate footballers in Bulgaria
Expatriate footballers in the Netherlands
Expatriate footballers in the Czech Republic
Expatriate soccer players in Australia
Expatriate association footballers in the Republic of Ireland
Senegalese expatriate sportspeople in the Netherlands
Senegalese expatriate sportspeople in Ireland